Erik Gustaf Blomqvist (5 January 1879 – 17 September 1956) was a Swedish sport shooter who competed in the 1912 Summer Olympics and in the 1920 Summer Olympics.

In 1912 he won the gold medal as member of the Swedish team in the team free rifle competition. In the 300 metre free rifle, three positions event he finished tenth. Eight years later he won the bronze medal as member of the Swedish team in the team 600 metre military rifle, prone competition.

In the 1920 Summer Olympics he also participated in the following events:

 600 metre military rifle, prone - fifth place
 Team 300 metre military rifle, prone - fifth place
 300 metre military rifle, prone - sixth place
 Team 300 and 600 metre military rifle, prone - sixth place
 Team free rifle - sixth place
 300 metre free rifle, three positions - place unknown

References

External links
profile

1879 births
1956 deaths
Swedish male sport shooters
ISSF rifle shooters
Olympic shooters of Sweden
Shooters at the 1912 Summer Olympics
Shooters at the 1920 Summer Olympics
Olympic gold medalists for Sweden
Olympic bronze medalists for Sweden
Olympic medalists in shooting
Medalists at the 1912 Summer Olympics
Medalists at the 1920 Summer Olympics
Sport shooters from Stockholm
19th-century Swedish people
20th-century Swedish people